Wahoo (Acanthocybium solandri) is a scombrid fish found worldwide in tropical and subtropical seas.

Wahoo may also refer to:

Biology 
 Eastern wahoo (Euonymus atropurpureus), a shrub native to eastern North America, also known as American wahoo or wahoo fruit
 Ulmus alata, the winged elm or wahoo, a deciduous tree in the southeastern and south central United States

Geography 
 Wahoo, California, a former settlement
 Wahoo, Nebraska, a city
 Wahoo, West Virginia, an unincorporated community in Marion County
 Wahoo Township, Saunders County, Nebraska, a township
 Wahoo, Florida, a populated area in Florida

Ships 
 USS Wahoo (SS-238), a Gato-class submarine
 Wahoo (SS-518), a Tench-class submarine
 Wahoo (SS-516), a Tench-class submarine
 USS Wahoo (SS-565), a Tang-class submarine

Sports 
 Chief Wahoo, a mascot for the Cleveland Indians baseball team
 Wahoos, an unofficial nickname for sports teams of the University of Virginia, officially referred to as the Cavaliers
 Wahoo McDaniel (1938–2002), American football player turned professional wrestler
 Pensacola Blue Wahoos, minor league baseball team located in Pensacola, FL

Other uses 
 Wahoo!, a 1965 album by American pianist and arranger Duke Pearson
 Wahoo (board game), a board game
 Wahoo! (company), a United States-based corporation which built fiberglass recreational boats from 1985 to 1996
 Wahoo (underwater nuclear test), conducted as part of Operation Hardtack I
 Wahoo Fitness, a manufacturer of cycling and fitness technology
 Wahoo's Fish Taco

See also 
 
 Yahoo (disambiguation)
 Woo Hoo (disambiguation)
 Big Chief Wahoo, comic strip and character
 Battle of Wahoo Swamp, (1838) of the Second Seminole War in Sumter County, Florida